Visard Tako (born 14 January 1995 in Korçë) is an Albanian professional footballer who most recently played for Albanian Second Division club Maliqi as a defender.

References

External links

1995 births
Living people
Footballers from Korçë
Albanian footballers
Association football defenders
KF Skënderbeu Korçë players
Bilisht Sport players
FK Dinamo Tirana players
KF Adriatiku Mamurrasi players
Kategoria e Dytë players
Kategoria e Parë players